Belgium is scheduled to compete at the 2024 Summer Olympics in Paris from 26 July to 11 August 2024. Since the country's debut in 1900, Belgian athletes have appeared in every edition of the Summer Olympic Games except for the sparsely attended St. Louis 1904.

Competitors
The following is the list of number of competitors in the Games. Note that reserves in field hockey, football, and handball are not counted:

Athletics

Belgian track and field athletes achieved the entry standards for Paris 2024, either by passing the direct qualifying mark (or time for track and road races) or by world ranking, in the following events (a maximum of 3 athletes each):

Track and road events

Equestrian

Belgium entered a full squad of equestrian riders to the jumping competition by winning the gold medal at the 2022 Jumping Nations Cup Final in Barcelona, Spain.

Jumping

References

Nations at the 2024 Summer Olympics
2024
2024 in Belgian sport